Dinara Rafikovna Sadretdinova  (b June 4, 1976) is a Russian actress and TV presenter. She was born in Moscow, Russia.

Education 
Sadretdinova studied at The Russian Academy of Theatre Arts, the Moscow Institute of Open Education and the Training Institute of Television and Radio.

Career 
Sadretdinova was presenter of the television program  Islam on the satellite channel "AST " from 1999 to 2001. In 2002, she became the TV presenter of the television program "Muslims" on the Information and entertainment channels. In March 2008, Sadretdinova was the guest of honor at the Al Jazeera International Documentary Film Festival in Qatar. She has been the guest of honor and presenter of the "Kazan International Festival of Muslim Cinema" two times.  Sadretdinova has also be a part of the International Media Forum "Interaction in the common interest" in the Republic of Adygea.
In October 2010, she was a part of the All Russian female Islamic Conference "Women will save the world" in the Chechen Republic.
That year, she was listed among the "best 10 female journalists in the Islamic world" and was invited to the International Conference of Women Journalists, held in Iran, where she was awarded the international prize "The Word Zainab".<>

References

External links 
 The Quran in the girls hearts . Dubai International Holy Quran Award
 TV-presenter of the weekly TV-program "Muslims" tells how she appeared in television and whether Russian TV viewer should wait for a new programme about Islam
 Official site of Dinara 
 Women conference on "Role of women in modern society" to be held in Saratov
 
 CNN Student News
 The headscarf makes me feel more feminine

Russian television personalities
Russian Muslims
Tatar people of Russia
1976 births
Living people